Nassiruddin Ubaidullah Ahrar (1404-1490 AD) (in Persian: ناصرالدین عبیدالله احرار) more popularly known as Khwaja Ahrar (in Persian: خواجه احرار) was a  Hanafi Maturidi member of the Golden Chain of the Naqshbandi Sufi spiritual order of Central Asia. He was born in Samarkand, a persian city in Central Asia, to a religious and devout muslim family. He was born to Khwaja Mehmood Shashi bin Khwaja Shihabuddin. His forefathers had migrated from Baghdad and his lineage connected to Abu Bakr Siddique from his paternal side and Umar Farooq from the maternal side. Khwaja Ahrar was deeply involved in the social, political and economics activities of Transaxonia. He was born into a relatively poor yet highly spiritual family and, at the age of maturity, he was probably the richest person in the kingdom. He was a close associate of all the leading dervishes of the time. Maulana Abdur Rahman Jami was a disciple of his. He learned and practiced the secrets of spirituality under his father and later under Khwaja Yaqub Charkhi.

Birth and family 
Khwaja's father was a farmer by profession and had also performed pilgrimage to Mecca. His paternal grandfather, Shahabuddin Shashi was also a farmer and trader. His maternal grandfather Khwaja Daud was the son of Khwaja Khawand Tahur who was an established sufi mystic and the son of Umar Baghistani, a famous shaikh who was honoured by Bahauddin Naqshband. His birth took place during the ramadan of 806 Hijri (March, 1404) in village near Tashkent called Baghistan. His birth was accompanied by a number of miracles and many saints had predicted the coming of a saint.

He has two sons, Khwaja Khwajgan and Khwaja Yahya.

Education and learning 
Initially, Ahrar studied in Tashkent, his uncle, Ibrahim Shashi also used to teach him. In 1425, his uncle took him to Samarqand for his studies. Repetitively falling sick during studies made him quit altogether but his spiritual states developed until once he saw prophet Jesus  in his dream where he said "I will teach you." He interpreted this to mean he would receive religious knowledge however other disagreed and said it meant medical knowledge.

Life 
After returning from Herat, at the age of 29, he had completed his training. He bought a piece of cultivable land and began farming. His land produced a great deal of yield and he was able to grow very fast. Within the period of a decade, he owned many farming lands, businesses, Turkish baths, khanqahs and was sending trading caravans well into China. Historians contend he had become one of the richest men of Central Asia. He used to spend most of his money on the needy. Most of his wealth was invested in Waqf (religious endowments) and was used for the needy.

Political life 
A Timurid prince, was the sultan of Samarqand at the time. Khwaja Ahrar went to meet him in order to discuss the condition of the people. However the chief aid of the sultan displayed no interest at which Khwaja Ahrar told him "I have been commanded by God and His messenger to come here". The sultan's aid still did not show any sign of talking and said the sultan is not concerned about the people. At this the Khwaja wrote the name of the Sultan on the wall and having erased it with his saliva said "God will replace you with a King who is concerned for his people" and left. Some days later as history records, Sultan Abu Sa'id Mirza, another Timurid King gathered his forces and attacked Samarqand. Sultan Abu Saeed later became the grandfather of Zahiruddin Muhammad Babur, the conqueror of India and creator of the Mughal Empire. This union of the Abu Sa'id Mirza and Khwaja Ahrar was to prove decades long and fruitful for the whole kingdom.

Khwaja Ahrar also named Babur in his infancy as Zahiruddin Muhammad literally 'Defender of Religion'.

The height of Khwaja Ahrar's career coincided with the cultural efflorescence of Herat during the reign of Sultan Husayn Bayqara. Many of his enemies accused him of amassing huge amount of wealth. However, he always spent his wealth for the poor. Regardless he became a very rich man owning more 3500 acres of cultivable land at one time. He had many properties, including mosques and madrassas that were waqf.

Spiritual life 
Khwaja Ahrar took his spiritual bayah (spiritual oath) from Yaqub al-Charkh. He had many disciples but the most famous was the famous sufi poet Mawlana Abdur Rahman Jami. Maulana Jami wrote a book dedicated to Ahrar which is called Tuhfa tul Ahrar and Khwaja Ahrar is also mention in Jami's most famous work Yusuf and Zulekha. Khwaja Ahrar is also known to have negotiated peace many times. His spiritual disciples are recorded to have shown extremely high etiquettes and morals in his presence.

Famous quotes 
"Everyone enters through a different door; I entered this Spiritual Order through the door of service.""Love and follow Lovers. Then you will be like them and their love will reflect on you.""Sufism requires you to carry everyone’s burdens and not to put yours on anyone."

Death 
Khwaja Ahrar passed away when he was 89 years old, Samarqand, in 1490 (896 Hijri). His chronogram is خلدِ برین which was discovered by Ali Shernawai. He left a huge fortune and his family continued his preachings.

References 

1404 births
1490 deaths
Naqshbandi order
Hanafis
Maturidis